Sarah Louise McCarthy-Fry ( Macaree; born 4 February 1955) is a British Labour Co-operative politician. She was the Member of Parliament for Portsmouth North from the 2005 general election to 2010. She was Exchequer Secretary to the Treasury in the last phase of the Labour government of Gordon Brown.

Early life
McCarthy-Fry is the daughter of a defence worker of Scottish descent. Fry is the surname of her first husband, McCarthy of her second. She was educated at Portsmouth High School. She worked for the multinational defence engineering company GKN Westland at Portsmouth, and later as financial controller for GKN Aerospace at Cowes, Isle of Wight.

Political career
McCarthy-Fry attempted selection as the Labour candidate for the seat of Portsmouth North in 1997, and later became Syd Rapson's campaign manager. Her main political interests are trade and industry, defence and the social economy. She campaigned in favour of identity cards after a constituency survey indicated a large majority were in favour of them, and stressed her support for their introduction in her maiden speech after her election in 2005.

In 2006, McCarthy-Fry was made PPS to John Healey, the Financial Secretary to the Treasury. In Prime Minister Gordon Brown's cabinet reshuffle in 2007, she was made PPS to Geoff Hoon, the Chief Whip. On 5 October 2008, she was promoted to become a Parliamentary Under-Secretary of State in the Department for Children, Schools and Families replacing Lord Adonis, who was moved from Education to Transport. This was a controversial move that brought about much speculation in the press afterward; Adonis was seen to be a key education reformer and it was assumed that the government no longer had education as a priority. McCarthy-Fry was moved to the Department for Communities and Local Government in the June 2009 reshuffle.

However, on 17 June 2009 she was appointed Exchequer Secretary to the Treasury, replacing Kitty Ussher after the latter resigned. She was at the Department for Communities and Local Government for just one week.

At the general election on 6 May 2010, McCarthy-Fry lost her seat to the Conservative candidate Penny Mordaunt. Along with Anne Snelgrove, she co-ordinated Ed Balls's campaign in the Labour party leadership election which followed.

Expenses controversy
In May 2009 The Daily Telegraph revealed that McCarthy-Fry had attempted to claim on her expenses for a £100 set of hair straighteners, though the claim was refused. Items the taxpayer did fund included £333 worth of bedding and a sewing box.

Later career
Soon after leaving parliament, McCarthy-Fry joined GKN Aerospace and was the company’s Financial Controller for Cowes, Isle of Wight, from 2010 to 2012, and then its Finance Director for Cowes, Isle of Wight, and Western Approach, Bristol, from  2012 to 2020, when she retired at the age of 65.

Personal life 
McCarthy-Fry married her first husband, Roger Fry, in 1973, and her second, Tony McCarthy, in 1997; she has four grown-up children.

References

External links 
 They Work For You
 Guardian biography
 Kaupthing Involvement
 Voting record at the Public Whip
 BBC Politics page
 Meet the MP at the BBC

News items 
 Concern over Royal Navy ships BBC News
 Upset over Boris Johnson BBC News

1955 births
Living people
Labour Co-operative MPs for English constituencies
Female members of the Parliament of the United Kingdom for English constituencies
UK MPs 2005–2010
Councillors in Hampshire
English people of Scottish descent
People educated at Portsmouth High School (Southsea)
Politicians from Portsmouth
Labour Party (UK) councillors
21st-century English women politicians
21st-century English politicians
Women councillors in England